Autograph is the 14th studio album by American singer-songwriter John Denver released in February 1980.

Track listing
All songs written and composed by John Denver, except where noted. 2001 CD bonus tracks were recorded at the same sessions in 1979.

Personnel
John Denver – vocals, 6- and 12-string guitars
Hal Blaine – drums, percussion
James Burton – electric and acoustic guitars, dobro
Emory Gordy Jr. – bass, mandolin
Glen Hardin – keyboards
Jim Horn – reeds
Herb Pedersen – banjo, electric & acoustic guitars
Denny Brooks – acoustic guitar
Danny Wheetman – mandolin, harmonica
Renée Armand-Horn, Denny Brooks, Herb Pedersen, Danny Wheetman - backing vocals
Lee Holdridge - orchestral arrangements

Production
Producer – Milton Okun
Recording Engineer – Ed Barton
Assistant Engineers – Ralph Osborn, Tchad Blake, Andrew Clark, Andy Todd & Randy Pipes
Recorded At – Filmways/Heider Studios, Hollywood, California June 11–21, 1979
A & R Coordination – Lynne Morse
LP Cover Photo – Edgar Boyles
LP Liner Photo – John Denver
LP Lyric Sleeve Photo – Scott Hensel/Gribbitt!
LP Art Direction & Design – Tim Bryant/Gribbitt!

Chart performance

References

John Denver albums
1980 albums
Albums arranged by Lee Holdridge
Albums produced by Milt Okun
RCA Records albums